Domodossola railway station serves the city and comune of Domodossola, in the Piedmont region, northwestern Italy.  Opened in 1888, it forms a major break of gauge junction between standard gauge lines to Milan, Brig and Novara, and a metre gauge line to Locarno.

The station is currently managed by Rete Ferroviaria Italiana (RFI).  However, the commercial area of the passenger building is managed by Centostazioni.  Train services on the line to Novara are operated by Trenitalia. Each of these companies is a subsidiary of Ferrovie dello Stato (FS), Italy's state-owned rail company. The link with Milan is operated by both Trenitalia and Trenord.

These two lines combine to form an international link, via Domodossola, between the German and Italian speaking parts of Switzerland.

Location
Domodossola railway station is situated at Piazza Giacomo Matteotti, at the eastern edge of the city centre.

History
The station was opened on 9 September 1888, together with the rest of the Domodossola–Arona section of the Milan–Domodossola railway. It was built as part of a railway construction project planned since the 1870s. The aim of the project was to break the isolation of the Ossola valley, by connecting it with Novara and Turin.

On 1 June 1906, Domodossola was extended to become an international facility, upon the opening of the Simplon Tunnel and the Brig–Domodossola railway that passes through it. The architect was Luigi Boffi who died in 1904, the station was built to his design following his death.

The metre gauge connection between Domodossola and Locarno entered service on 27 November 1923.

Features
The passenger building has a significant architectural façade, with a string course of Baveno granite and three cornices.

Passenger movements
The station has about 1.4 million passenger movements each year.

Interchange
From the bus terminal located near the station there are direct buses to the main municipalities in the Ossola valley, and inter-urban routes to Verbania, Omegna and Milan Malpensa Airport.

Services
The following services stop at Domodossola:

 RegioExpress: service every two hours to Milano Centrale.
 Regionale:

See also

History of rail transport in Italy
List of railway stations in Piedmont
Rail transport in Italy
Railway stations in Italy

References

External links
 

Railway stations in the Province of Verbano-Cusio-Ossola
Railway stations opened in 1888
Art Nouveau architecture in Italy
Art Nouveau railway stations
Buildings and structures in Domodossola